Terry Evans (August 14, 1937 – January 20, 2018) was an American R&B, blues, and soul singer, guitarist and songwriter.  He worked with many musicians including Ry Cooder, Bobby King, John Fogerty, Eric Clapton, Joan Armatrading, John Lee Hooker, Boz Scaggs, Maria Muldaur and Hans Theessink. Cooder stated that he always thought that Evans made a better "frontman."

Between 1994 and his death, Evans  released seven solo albums, including Blues for Thought (1994) Come to the River (1997) and Fire in the Feeling (2005).  Evans' career was inspired by Elmore James, Little Walter, Albert King, and B.B. King.  Songs he wrote were recorded by Pops Staples and Louis Jordan.

Life and career
Terry Lee Evans was born in Vicksburg, Mississippi, United States, and sang in his local church choir. His parents were keen for him to concentrate purely on gospel music, although Evans found exposure to the work of mainstream blues musicians. He worked semi professionally with an a cappella group called the Knights before relocating in the 1960s to Los Angeles.  He expanded his repertoire by learning to play the guitar and started to write songs for other musicians.  Amongst those who recorded his songs were Pops Staples ("Love Is a Precious Thing") and Louis Jordan ("Hop, Skip, and Jump"). Unable to find his own fame, despite television exposure, Evans teamed with fellow soul and gospel singer, Bobby King. They performed regularly on the Chitlin' Circuit throughout the 1970s, although Evans also worked as a backing vocalist for Ry Cooder.  His backup work is featured on several of Cooder's albums, including Chicken Skin Music (1976), My Name Is Buddy (2007) and some of his final recorded work featured on Cooder's The Prodigal Son (2018). Evans joint work with King saw the release of two albums in 1988 and 1990.

He gained a bigger audience through his involvement in the soundtrack to the 1986 film, Crossroads.  Evans voice appeared on the title track in the film itself, and on the soundtrack on another song, "Down in Mississippi". Evans later worked with Lloyd Jones' on the latter's album, Trouble Monkey, before recording his first solo album, Blues for Thought (1994). It was produced by Ry Cooder, who also played guitar on the recording. Evans sang backing vocals on the Dutch singer and guitarist Hans Theessink's 1997 album, Journey On. Evans 2001 album, Mississippi Magic was nominated for a Blues Music Award as the "Best Soul Blues Album of the Year". On Evans 2005 album, Fire in the Feeling, David Lindley guest starred playing guitar on a couple of the tracks.

Evans' last recording was his joint effort with Theessink, on Delta Time (2012). CBC News journalist, Bianca Cervantes, opined that "Delta Time is the latest transatlantic blues treasure."

In 2014, Evans was featured on the compilation Songs from a Stolen Spring.  On the album Evans' performance of "Dancing in the Street" was meshed with Lebanese singer-songwriter Tania Saleh's "Not a Word was Spoken".

Evans died on January 20, 2018, at the age of 80.

Discography

Albums

References

External links
Official website

1937 births
2018 deaths
20th-century American male singers
20th-century American singers
20th-century African-American singers
21st-century American male singers
21st-century American singers
21st-century African-American singers
American blues singers
American soul singers
American rhythm and blues singers
American blues guitarists
African-American male guitarists
Songwriters from Mississippi
Musicians from Vicksburg, Mississippi
20th-century American guitarists
21st-century American guitarists
Guitarists from Mississippi
African-American male songwriters